The Wake is the debut studio album by English post-punk band The Wake, released in 1982 by record label Factory.

It was reissued on Factory Benelux in 1984), LTM Recordings in 2001 (as Harmony + Singles) and Factory Benelux again in 2013 (CD and double LP).

Reception 

Stewart Mason of AllMusic called it "standard early-'80s Factory Records post-punk gloom, not terribly different from any of a dozen other Joy Division wannabes".

Track listing
All tracks composed by The Wake
Factory FACT-60, 1982
Side 1:
"Judas" 	3:18
"Testament" 	2:16
"Patrol" 	3:30
"The Old Men" 	5:50
Side 2:
"Favour" 	4:13
"Heartburn" 	4:58
"An Immaculate Conception" 	5:01

Factory Benelux FBN-29, 1984
same as FACT-60 with extra track "Chance" end of side 2 not listed on sleeve

LTM LTMCD-2323, 2001
Factory Benelux FBN-29-CD, 2013
"Favour" 	4:13
"Heartburn" 	4:58
"An Immaculate Conception" 	5:01
"Judas" 	3:18
"Testament" 	2:16
"Patrol" 	3:30
"The Old Men" 	5:50
"Chance" 	3:47
"Something Outside" 	7:42
"Host" 	7:55
"The Drill" 	4:18
"Uniform" 	5:29
"Here Comes Everybody" 	6:58
"On Our Honeymoon" 	2:07
"Give Up" 	2:35

Factory Benelux FBN-29, 2013
Side 1:
"Judas" 	04:20
"Testament" 	05:06
"Patrol" 	05:07
"The Old Men" 	03:27
Side 2:
"Favor" 	02:21
"Heartburn" 	03:36
"An Immaculate Conception" 	06:10
"Chance" 	03:25
Side 3:
"Something Outside" 	07:52
"Host" 	08:00
Side 4:
"The Drill" (Peel Session) 	04:24
"Uniform" (Peel Session) 	05:35
"Here Comes Everybody" (Peel Session) 	07:05

References

External links 

 

1982 debut albums
Factory Records albums
Post-punk albums by British artists